Ian Lochhead (born 26 September 1939) was a Scottish footballer who played for Celtic and Dumbarton.

References

1939 births
Scottish footballers
Dumbarton F.C. players
Celtic F.C. players
Scottish Football League players
2004 deaths
Association football forwards